Hurford is a surname. Notable people with the surname include:

Chris Hurford (born 1931), Australian politician
David P. Hurford, American psychologist
James Hurford, British linguist
John Hurford (born 1948), English artist
Peter Hurford (1930–2019), English classical organist and composer
Richard Hurford (born 1944), Australian Anglican bishop